Blair Junction is the neglected site of a formerly populated settlement in Esmeralda County, in the U.S. state of Nevada.

History
Blair Junction was at the junction of the Tonopah and Goldfield Railroad and the Silver Peak Railroad, located 0.7 miles south of the present Blair Junction on Nevada State Route 265.  On the Tonopah and Goldfield Railroad, Coaldale was to the west and McLeans was to the east.

A post office called Blair Junction was in operation from 1922 until 1923.

References

Ghost towns in Esmeralda County, Nevada
Ghost towns in Nevada